Jordon Thompson (born 8 April 1999) is an English professional footballer who plays as a defender for National League North club Hereford.

Career
In March 2017, Thompson was rewarded with a professional contract at Coventry City. During the second year of his scholarship Thompson was part of the team that won the U18 PL2 South keeping 12 clean sheets in a row. As a reward for his fine form, Thompson broke into the first team squad for the League Two Playoff Final at Wembley Stadium. 

He joined National League side Barrow in September 2017 on a one-month loan deal.

Thompson was recalled from Barrow and soon after made his professional debut in the EFL Trophy 2–1 win over West Bromwich Albion U21s on 7 November 2017.

On 31 January 2020, Thompson signed with Wrexham, on an initial 28-day loan from Coventry City. Thompson enjoyed a consistent run of games at the Racecourse which saw the club stay clear of the relegation spots before the season was curtailed. 

In April 2021, Jordon joined National League side Solihull Moors on loan until 31 May 2021. Thompson was part of a defence which kept five clean sheets in eight games which saw the Moors narrowly miss out on the playoffs. 

On 12 May 2021 it was announced that he would leave Coventry at the end of the season, following the expiry of his contract.

On 11 September 2021, Thompson signed a one year deal with Gloucester City. On the 11 March 2022, after a prolonged spell of good form at both centre back and right back, Thompson was awarded the club's player of the month award. He went on to make 28 league appearances for Gloucester City, scoring four goals.

After leaving Gloucester City, Thompson signed with National League North side Hereford on 24 September 2022 and made his debut that same day in a 3-0 league win at home to Blyth Spartans.

Career statistics

Honours
Coventry City
EFL League Two play-offs: 2018

References

1999 births
Living people
Footballers from Islington (district)
English footballers
Coventry City F.C. players
Barrow A.F.C. players
Boreham Wood F.C. players
Wrexham A.F.C. players
Solihull Moors F.C. players
Gloucester City A.F.C. players
National League (English football) players
Association football defenders